Deep Evil is a 2004 American film directed by Pat Williams, starring Lorenzo Lamas, Ona Grauer and Adam J. Harrington.

Plot
In the 1950s an alien microbe was found aboard a crashed alien spacecraft in remote Siberia. In the year 2004, US scientists working at a top secret underground laboratory in Alaska clone the microbe. A garbled distress signal is heard from the laboratory just before a complete lock down of the facility. This is the last word sent out from the scientists. A rescue team with scientists and military personnel is sent in to find out what went wrong.

Cast
Lorenzo Lamas as Trainor
Ona Grauer as Dr. Cole
Adam J. Harrington as Major Michael Ross
Jim Thorburn as Prof. Peter Langdon
Will Sanderson as Sgt. Hall

External links

2004 films
American science fiction horror films
2000s science fiction horror films
2000s English-language films
2000s American films